Ellary White (born 3 September 1991) is an English footballer who played as a defender for the Montserrat national team in 2003. He was eligible to play for Montserrat because his father was born in Montserrat.

He played for English youth team Rothwell Aztec, as well as representing the Montsaye school football team, and is a former Northampton Town, and Kettering Town youth player.

References

External links

Desborough teenager picked to play for Montserrat Northants Evening Telegraph, 21 April 2008

Living people
1991 births
British people of Montserratian descent
Montserratian footballers
English footballers
Association football defenders
Montserrat international footballers